A leap year starting on Monday is any year with 366 days (i.e. it includes 29 February) that begins on Monday, 1 January, and ends on Tuesday, 31 December. Its dominical letters hence are GF. The most recent year of such kind was 1996 and the next one will be 2024 in the Gregorian calendar or, likewise, 2008, and 2036 in the obsolete Julian calendar.

Any leap year that starts on Monday, Wednesday or Thursday has two Friday the 13ths: those two in this leap year occur in September and December. Common years starting on Tuesday share this characteristic.

In this leap year, Martin Luther King Jr. Day is on its earliest possible date, January 15; Valentine's Day is on a Wednesday; Presidents Day is on February 19; the leap day is on a Thursday; Saint Patrick's Day is on a Sunday; Memorial Day is on May 27, Juneteenth is on a Wednesday; U.S. Independence Day and Halloween are on a Thursday; Thanksgiving is on its latest possible date, November 28; and Christmas Day is on a Wednesday.

The Election Day in the USA is on November 5th, as well in common years starting on Tuesday.

Calendars

Applicable years

Gregorian Calendar 
Leap years that begin on Monday, along with those that start on Saturday or Thursday, occur least frequently: 13 out of 97 (≈ 13.402%) total leap years of the Gregorian calendar. Their overall occurrence is thus 3.25% (13 out of 400).

400 year cycle

century 1:  024, 052, 080

century 2:  120, 148, 176

century 3:  216, 244, 272

century 4:  312, 340, 368, 396

Julian Calendar 
Like all leap year types, the one starting with 1 January on a Monday occurs exactly once in a 28-year cycle in the Julian calendar, i.e. in 3.57% of years. As the Julian calendar repeats after 28 years that means it will also repeat after 700 years, i.e. 25 cycles. The year's position in the cycle is given by the formula ((year + 8) mod 28) + 1).

References

Gregorian calendar
Monday